The Eight Summits is the collective name for the eight highest mountain peaks on each of the seven continents (Australia has two entries). It is an alternative name for the "Seven Summits" due to different ways in naming the highest mountain on the continent of Australia.

Mountaineers can all agree that climbing all the summits is among the supreme accomplishments of their sport. The list of successful climbers has been listed on the Internet as a lifetime pride.

The Eight Summits consists of:

 Mount Everest, the highest mountain peak of Asia
 Aconcagua, the highest mountain peak of South America
 Denali, the highest mountain peak of North America
 Mount Kilimanjaro, the highest mountain peak of Africa
 Mount Elbrus, the highest mountain peak of Europe
 Vinson Massif, the highest mountain peak of Antarctica
 Puncak Jaya, the highest mountain peak of Australia (continent)
 Mount Kosciuszko, the highest mountain peak of Australia (mainland)

Puncak Jaya is also the highest mountain peak of an island on Earth.

Controversy 
Due to the difference in definition and the controversy on the boundaries of continents. There were several versions of the "Seven Summits".

The most prominent one includes "The Messner List" which omitted Mount Kosciuszko in Mainland Australia. Supporters of this list argue that Puncak Jaya in Indonesia should be regarded as the Summit for the Australian continent. This is also due to the fact that reaching the summit of Mount Kosciuszko involves a simple hike with no mountaineering requirements and is thus a considerably easier task than any of the other mountains. Another list is called "The Bass List", named after Richard Bass, the first mountaineer to complete his particular list of "Seven Summits" which omitted Puncak Jaya in Indonesia.

This results in the list for the "Eight Summits", including both Puncak Jaya (also named Carstensz Pyramid or abbreviated as CP) and Mount Kosciuszko (abbreviated as K). This list is also called "The Bass and Messner List".

See also 

 Eight-thousander
 Explorers Grand Slam, also known as the Adventurers Grand Slam
 Extremes on Earth
 List of highest mountains on Earth
 List of islands by highest point
 Lists of mountains (for other climbing lists)
 Seven Summits
 Three Poles Challenge

References 

Peak bagging
Seven Summits